Regio Călători (former Regiotrans) is a private rail company headquartered in Brașov, Romania. It was founded in 2005 and is  exclusively active in the passenger transport sector. At present Regiotrans runs about 200 train services per day.

Trains

Electronic Trains 
nu|miniatura|400x400px|BB 25500 ex SNCF / FRET

History
On March 17, 2015, the Romanian Rail Safety Authority revoked the company's Part B safety certificate and the company ceased operations on all routes until further notice. Căile Ferate Române (CFR), the national rail carrier has taken over (from March 18, 2015, for the time being) some of the routes; but not all, and those that CFR had taken on operated with a skeleton service. The sudden cessation of Regiotrans services, with virtually no notice, took many travellers by surprise; some passengers being stranded in fields. Their Regiotrans season tickets were honoured by CFR, but clearly only if CFR were providing an emergency replacement. A refund, however, was available for longer period season ticket holders.

Particularly in the Banat region, there were no alternative bus routes. Many villages and even substantial towns, therefore, had no practical public transport option. Services restarted on certain routes on 1 April 2015, the company apparently having obtained the safety certificates following a fast track procedure ( "în regim de urgență"). Further re-openings were effected in mid/late April 2015 (for example Ineu–Cermei), several routes, however, remain closed, following changes  in the subsidy allocations and calculation' regulations, that occurred in March 2015.

The Company had been experiencing difficulties due to alleged subsidy corruption. Not the least problem faced by its major shareholders and directors, was the fact that a majority shareholder and joint senior executive, Costel Comana somehow managed, after taking drugs, to commit suicide by hanging himself with his shoelaces ("cu șireturile de la pantofi") in a toilet aboard an air flight between Colombia and Costa Rica. Comana had fled Romania for Brazil after the arrest of his co-chief executive (and joint owner of Regioalatori), Iorgu Ganea. Ganea had been arrested and faced prosecution regarding subsidy irregularities.

Routes
Regiotrans primarily runs local trains. Many of the services (especially in the Banat) are very infrequent, with the service between Liebling and Jebel running just once a week until its withdrawal on 1 April 2015. Indeed, a number of services appear to have been withdrawn from this date. Others lines have had their services drastically reduced: for example between Praid and Bălăușeri (on the line Praid–Blaj) there is now only one train per day in each direction which makes a round trip from Praid for any purpose impossible.

Rolling stock is mainly former SNCF Class X 4500 diesel multiple units and for long routes RIO/RIB multiple units with SNCF class BB 25500 push pull electric locomotives.

It is the only operator on several routes: 
 Brașov–Zărnești
 Brașov–Întorsura Buzăului
 Sfântu Gheorghe–Brețcu
 Blaj–Praid
 Alba Iulia–Zlatna
 Bistrița Nord–Sărățel-Luduș
 Timișoara Nord–Cruceni
 Timișoara Nord–Voiteni–Reșița Nord
 Lovrin–Cenad
 Lovrin–Nerău
 Arad–Nădlac
 Arad–Sânnicolau Mare–Vălcani
 Ineu–Cermei
 Iași–Podu Iloaiei–Hârlău
 Iași–Lețcani–Dângeni–Dorohoi
 Roman–Buhăiești–Iași
 Golești–Câmpulung Muscel - Argeșel

On other routes it operates alongside the public railway company CFR (usually with lower frequencies):
 Brașov–Alba Iulia
 Sibiu–Copșa Mică - Sighişoara
 Alba Iulia–Cluj-Napoca (never operated)
 Arad–Ineu–Brad (only section Arad to Sântana is shared with CFR)

Regiotrans also have a few long distance trains: 
 Brașov–București Nord
 Brașov–Constanța seasonal
 Brașov–Iași 

Occasionally Regiotrans operated a tourist steam train, named Dracula Express, between Brașov–Zărnești and Brașov–Întorsura Buzăului.

References

External links 
 
Regiotrans website

Railway companies of Romania
Passenger rail transport in Romania
Companies based in Braşov